The Danny Thomas Show (titled Make Room for Daddy for its first three seasons) is an American sitcom that ran from 1953 to 1957 on ABC and from 1957 to 1964 on CBS. Starring Danny Thomas as a successful night club entertainer, the show focused on his relationship with his family, yet went through a number of significant changes in cast and characters during the course of its run. Episodes regularly featured music by Thomas, guest stars and occasionally other cast members as part of the plot.

In March 1953, Thomas first signed the contract for the show with ABC and chose Desilu Studios to film it using its three-camera method. Two proposed titles during pre-production were The Children's Hour and Here Comes Daddy.

Synopsis

Thomas played the role of Danny Williams, a successful comedian and nightclub entertainer at the Copa Club, based on the iconic New York City nightclub the Copacabana. In the show's first iteration as Make Room for Daddy, Jean Hagen played Thomas' serious and loving wife Margaret. Their daughter Terry was played by Sherry Jackson and their son Rusty by Rusty Hamer. The show's premise involved Danny rarely having time to spend with his family and Margaret having to deal with the children virtually on her own. She often felt neglected by Danny, and on several occasions felt like leaving him. Margaret was a society woman and strict with the children, but loved her family.

Louise Beavers made several appearances during this era as the Williams' maid, Louise Evans, and often was at odds with Danny and sided with Margaret in most of the couple's arguments. Nana Bryant often appeared as Margaret's kind mother, of whom Danny and the children were fond, but Margaret, who had been raised by her aunt and uncle because of her mother often being away on stage tours, was not as warm to her mother. (Bryant died in late 1955, and rather than the character being recast, she simply disappeared. When Louise Beavers became ill in 1955, Amanda Randolph assumed the role of Louise.)

Cast

 Danny Thomas as Danny Williams
 Jean Hagen as Margaret Williams (1953–1956)
 Marjorie Lord as Kathy "Clancey" O'Hara Williams (1957–1964)
 Rusty Hamer as Rusty Williams
 Angela Cartwright as Linda Williams (1957–1964)
 Sherry Jackson as Terry Williams (1953–1958)
 Penney Parker as Terry Williams (1959–1960)
 Louise Beavers as Louise (1953–1955)
 Amanda Randolph as Louise (1955–1964)

Supporting

The supporting cast included:
 Sid Melton as Charlie Halper
 Pat Carroll as Bunny Halper (1961–1964)
 Sheldon Leonard as Phil Brokaw (1957–1961)
 Ben Lessy as Benny (1953–1959)
 Mary Wickes as Liz O'Neal (1955–1957)
 Pat Harrington Jr. as Pat Hannigan (1959–1960)
 Jesse White as Jesse Leeds (1953–1957)

Notable guest stars
Hans Conried had nineteen guest appearances as Danny's eccentric Lebanese "Uncle Tonoose". (In real life, Thomas was Lebanese, Conried was not.) Other frequent guests included Bill Dana as José Jiménez, Annette Funicello as an Italian exchange student named Gina Manelli, and Thomas' protégée Italian teenaged singer Piccola Pupa. Other notable guest stars included band leader and musician Harry James, who appeared in the episode "The Trumpet Player", child pianist Ginny Tiu playing Li Chow in "The Chinese Doll" and Jimmy Durante, who appeared as himself in the episode "Danny and Durante". Lucille Ball and Desi Arnaz appeared in one episode together as their characters from I Love Lucy, and appearing as themselves in various episodes were Bob Hope, Jack Benny, Milton Berle, Max Baer, Sammy Davis Jr., Dinah Shore, and Dean Martin. Tony Bennett made his TV debut in 1957 as Danny's singing cousin Stephen from Toledo, and Paul Anka played a young up-and-coming singer, as did Bobby Rydell. Zsa Zsa Gabor played a nightclub performer. Tennessee Ernie Ford portrayed a singer named Kentucky Cal. Brenda Lee plays Danny's maid, whom he hires as a singer.

Episodes

Background and production 
For its first four years, Make Room For Daddy on ABC (retitled The Danny Thomas Show ahead of its fourth season) garnered decent ratings, but failed to make the list of the top 30 programs. Shortly after the third season finished filming, Jean Hagen left the show over dissatisfaction with her role and frequent clashes with Danny Thomas. Thomas was upset with her for leaving, and felt the show would not last without her. However, he decided to push on. At the start of the fourth season, both Thomas and producer Sheldon Leonard were faced with a serious dilemma—how to explain Hagen's absence. To have "Danny" and "Margaret" divorce in that era would have been unacceptable to television audiences, so it was explained that Margaret had died suddenly off-screen. It was a risky move because until this time, no character on a TV situation comedy had died.

Danny was now a widower juggling a performing career while raising two children on his own. With the absence of Jean Hagen, character actress-comedienne Mary Wickes (who had worked with Thomas and singer-actress Doris Day in the 1952 Warner Bros. musical film I'll See You in My Dreams) was cast in the recurring role of Liz O'Neill, Danny Williams's no-nonsense press agent. Wickes remained with the show until 1958. During the show's fourth season, it was Liz, along with Louise and Danny's friends, who often looked after the children while he was touring.  He decided to move them to a boarding school, but later relented and the family moved into a new apartment. Also in that year, Danny dated a few other women and nearly got engaged to a widowed singer until he found out she did not like children. By season's end, the ratings had suffered and it was decided that a wife and mother was needed to complete the family unit.
 
In a four-part story arc that began airing in April 1957, son Rusty fell ill with the measles and Danny hired Kathy O'Hara (Marjorie Lord), a young Irish nurse, to look after him. Kathy was a widow with a little girl (played by Lelani Sorenson). Danny and Kathy became fast friends and, not surprisingly, Danny quickly fell in love with her, as did the kids. In the season finale, the two became engaged. In a curious twist, ABC at this point canceled the series, which proved to be fortunate. In the spring of 1957, I Love Lucy, which had reigned as the top-rated show for almost all of its six-year run on CBS, was ending production. When CBS heard that ABC was cancelling the series, CBS picked it up as part of its 1957-58 schedule.

The Danny Thomas Show made its CBS debut on Monday, October 7, 1957, at 9:00 inheriting the time slot vacated by I Love Lucy. The fifth-season premiere episode, "Lose Me In Las Vegas", had Danny and Kathy already married and on their honeymoon. The Williams family moved into a larger brand-new apartment and, with the change of network, the producers also changed Kathy's daughter. Lelani Sorenson was dropped from the cast and replaced by Angela Cartwright as Linda. Linda then was adopted by Danny, and the show's ratings dramatically increased. At the end of its fifth season, The Danny Thomas Show posted its highest rating, ranking at No. 2. During this season, Amanda Randolph was sick and rarely appeared as Louise, who was said to be recovering from the flu, with Kathy doing most of the housework.

In the early part of the sixth season, Sherry Jackson left the show and the character of Terry was said to have gone to a girls school in Paris. Jackson commented on her close friendship with Jean Hagen and why she left the series, saying, "The major perk was Jean Hagen. I adored her. We had a great time. She and I were best buddies; she was my only friend from the Make Room for Daddy cast. What made me specifically want to leave the show? I had a five-year contract, Jean had a three-year contract. Jean was thoroughly fed up with the series and made it clear that she didn't want to come back. When she left, I was devastated. I didn't want to continue, either. I wanted to break my contract. They wouldn't let me leave, but gave me less to do; that's why I'm in fewer shows from ages 14–16."

In Season 7, the character of Terry was brought back, but recast with Penney Parker. Terry was featured in a seven-episode story arc that had her engaged and eventually married to Pat Hannigan (Pat Harrington, Jr.), a nightclub friend of Danny's. After the wedding, the Hannigans moved to California and Terry was rarely mentioned, never to be seen on the show again.

In the last two seasons, with Thomas and Lord tired of their roles, Danny and Kathy both regularly traveled, and for much of the tenth season they toured Europe (with a handful of episodes featuring location footage). Rusty and Linda were looked after by Danny's manager, Charlie Halper (Sid Melton) and his wife Bunny (Pat Carroll). During the 11th and final season, Thomas decided to retire from the show and the program ended in the spring of 1964, finishing as still one of the most popular television programs and ranking at number nine.

Music 
The theme music was various versions (changing over the years) of the traditional Irish song, "Danny Boy".

Broadcast

Syndication 

Reruns of the show (using the original title, "Make Room for Daddy") were aired weekdays on NBC from October 4, 1960, to March 26, 1965. The episodes shown were from season one through season nine). CBS aired primetime repeats April 19 through September 6, 1965, on Monday nights at 9:30 p.m (Eastern time). Subsequently, most of the CBS episodes were then syndicated in fall, 1967, and offered to local stations. The first four seasons from ABC were not put into syndication.

From February 1, 1987, to 1991, the show's fifth through ninth seasons were shown on Nick at Nite. TV Land and GoodLife Television aired the majority of the episodes from the fourth season through the seventh season (and select episodes from seasons eight and nine).

Me-TV aired the show from Labor Day of 2012 to December 31, 2014.

In 2014, the series joined the weekday line up of Cozi TV, where it has as of 2021 stopped airing but did broadcast all the 1956–1964 episodes which includes the season after Jean Hagen left the show (1956–1957). Cozi-TV also added the final two seasons of the show (Seasons 10 and 11) that had not been shown in any package of reruns since 1965.

Episodes of the show can be seen on TVS Nostalgia Network.Com. Season 5 (only) is available on Hulu.

George Carlin referred to the reruns as "Daddy has had room made for".

Home media 
On September 28, 2004, Questar released the complete fifth season on Region 1 DVD. The set includes two special episodes: the fourth-season finale, "Danny's Proposal", and the pilot for The Andy Griffith Show.

The complete sixth season on DVD was released on January 22. 2008.  It was released by a different company than the one that had handled the fifth-season package, and contained uncut episodes with vintage second-run opening titles from the early 1960s NBC network daytime reruns.

Several of the early episodes with Jean Hagen can be purchased on discount DVDs, as these episodes have entered public domain because of lapsed copyright.

Media information

Spinoff and crossovers 
The series played a role in the creation of another long-running sitcom, The Andy Griffith Show. In the seventh season, Danny Thomas is arrested by Sheriff Andy Taylor (Andy Griffith) and detained in the small town of Mayberry in an episode titled "Danny Meets Andy Griffith". The episode aired on February 15, 1960, and The Andy Griffith Show premiered later that year on October 3.

The series also crossed over to several other series, including The Lucy-Desi Comedy Hour and The Joey Bishop Show.

Morey Amsterdam guest-starred as Buddy Sorrell of The Dick Van Dyke Show in the episode "The Woman Behind the Jokes", season 11, episode 4.

Some episodes featured Bill Dana as José Jiménez, which led to the spin-off series The Bill Dana Show. Danny Thomas played himself in one episode.

Sequel 

The show ended in 1964, but Danny Thomas, Marjorie Lord, Angela Cartwright, Rusty Hamer, Sherry Jackson, Amanda Randolph and Hans Conried returned in 1965 for a two-hour-long "reunion" special on NBC, The Danny Thomas TV Family Reunion, considered the first TV reunion show, and Make More Room for Daddy, which aired as an episode of The Danny Thomas Hour in November 1967. Shortly after filming the second special in 1967, Randolph died suddenly of a stroke at the age of 70. A CBS reunion special, Make Room for Granddaddy, was aired in 1969. The special did so well that it was picked up as a series by CBS, but Thomas considered its assigned time slot to be too quiet and pulled the show.

ABC brought it back on a weekly basis in 1970, in Make Room for Granddaddy. For the series premiere, Sherry Jackson reprised her role of oldest daughter Terry. No mention was made of her husband Pat Hannigan. Instead, for this new version of the series, Terry's husband was named Bill, who was a soldier. In this episode, Terry left her son, six-year-old Michael (played by Michael Hughes), in the care of grandparents Danny and Kathy so she could join Bill, who was stationed overseas. In addition to Lord, Hamer and Cartwright, the only other returning regulars were Sid Melton as Charley Halper and Hans Conried as Uncle Tonoose. During that season, new characters were played by Stanley Myron Handelman and former football player Roosevelt Grier. Pat Carroll did not reprise her role of Bunny Halper and her character was never mentioned on this series. The show lasted only one year, producing 24 episodes; its cancellation came at a time when the networks were purging content favoring older, rural and other less affluent viewers after the loss of a half-hour of daily program time in 1971. According to Lord, the series faced many obstacles, including the unprofessionalism and inexperience of the child actor Michael Hughes, the absence of Sheldon Leonard as producer/director to control Thomas and improve the quality of the scripts, and the fact that ABC switched the time slot of the show from Wednesday nights at 8:00 pm to Thursday nights at 9:00 pm. As a result, the ratings went from mediocre to poor.

Notes

References

External links 

1953 American television series debuts
1964 American television series endings
1970 American television series debuts
1971 American television series endings
1950s American sitcoms
1960s American sitcoms
1970s American sitcoms
American Broadcasting Company original programming
Television series about families
Black-and-white American television shows
CBS original programming
English-language television shows
Primetime Emmy Award for Outstanding Comedy Series winners
Television shows set in New York City